Tinker Take-Off is a weekly newspaper created for publication on Tinker Air Force Base in Midwest City, Oklahoma and began publication in 1943. The newspaper was published in partnership with The Journal Record, a daily business newspaper based in Oklahoma City, Oklahoma.

History 
Tinker Take-Off changed their publication type from the traditional broadsheet newspaper format to a magazine format in 2019, as well as changing it to a biweekly newspaper instead of a weekly newspaper.

The publication paused publication in May 2020 during the COVID-19 pandemic.

References 

Military newspapers published in the United States
Newspapers established in 1943
Weekly newspapers published in the United States
Newspapers published in Oklahoma City